In land-use planning, urban green space is open-space areas reserved for parks and other "green spaces", including plant life, water features -also referred to as blue spaces- and other kinds of natural environment. Most  urban open spaces are green spaces, but occasionally include other kinds of open areas. The landscape of urban open spaces can range from playing fields to highly maintained environments to relatively natural landscapes.

Generally considered open to the public, urban green spaces are sometimes privately owned, such as higher education campuses, neighborhood/community parks/gardens, and institutional or corporate grounds. Areas outside city boundaries, such as state and national parks as well as open space in the countryside, are not considered urban open space. Streets, piazzas, plazas and urban squares are not always defined as urban open space in land use planning. Urban green spaces have wide reaching positive impacts on the health of individuals and communities near the green space.

Urban greening policies are important for revitalizing communities, reducing financial burdens of healthcare and increasing quality of life. Most policies focus on community benefits, and reducing negative effects of urban development, such as surface runoff and the urban heat island effect. Historically, access to green space has favored wealthier, and more privileged communities, thus recent focus in urban greening has increasingly focused on environmental justice concerns, and community engagement in the greening process. In particular, in cities with economic decline, such as the Rust Belt in the United States, urban greening has broad community revitalization impacts.

Urban areas have greatly expanded and resulted in over half of the world's population to be located in urban locations. As the population continues to grow, this number is predicted to be at two-thirds of people living in urban areas by 2050.

Definitions and concepts
People living in cities and towns generally have weaker mental health in comparison to people living in less crowded areas. Urban green spaces are pieces of nature in the cities designed to try to solve the problem.

Most research on the topic focus on urban green spaces. The WHO defined this as "all urban land covered by vegation of any kind".

When doing research, some experts use "urban open space" to describe a broader range of open areas. One definition holds that, "As the counterpart of development, urban open space is a natural and cultural resource, synonymous with neither 'unused land' nor 'park and recreation areas'." Another is "Open space is land and/or water area with its surface open to the sky, consciously acquired or publicly regulated to serve conservation and urban shaping function in addition to providing recreational opportunities." In almost all instances, the space referred to by the term is, in fact, green space, focused on natural areas.

These spaces are part of "public space" broadly construed, which include meeting or gathering places that exist outside the home and workplace, and which foster resident interaction and opportunities for contact and proximity. This definition implies a higher level of community interaction and places a focus on public involvement rather than public ownership or stewardship.

Benefits
The benefits that urban open space provides to citizens can be broken into four basic forms; recreation, ecology, aesthetic value, and positive health impacts. Psychological research shows that benefits gained by visitors to urban green spaces increased with their biodiversity, indicating that 'green' alone is not sufficient; the quality of that green is important as well.

Recreational

Urban open space is often appreciated for the recreational opportunities it provides. Recreation in urban open space may include active recreation (such as organized sports and individual exercise) or passive recreation. Research shows that when open spaces are attractive and accessible, people are more likely to engage in physical activity. Time spent in an urban open space for recreation offers a reprieve from the urban environment and a break from over-stimulation. Studies done on physically active adults middle aged and older show there are amplified benefits when the physical activities are coupled with green space environments. Such coupling leads to decreased levels of stress, lowers the risk for depression as well as increase the frequency of participation in exercise.

Ecological
The conservation of nature in an urban environment has direct impact on people for another reason as well.  A Toronto civic affairs bulletin entitled Urban Open Space: Luxury or Necessity makes the claim that "popular awareness of the balance of nature, of natural processes and of man's place in and effect on nature – i.e., "ecological awareness" – is important.  As humans live more and more in man-made surroundings – i.e., cities – he risks harming himself by building and acting in ignorance of natural processes."  Beyond this man-nature benefit, urban open spaces also serve as islands of nature, promoting biodiversity and providing a home for natural species in environments that are otherwise uninhabitable due to city development.

By having the opportunity to be within an urban green space, people gain a higher appreciation for the nature around them. As Bill McKibben mentions in his book The End of Nature, people will only truly understand nature if they are immersed within it. He follows in Henry David Thoreau's footsteps when he isolated himself in the Adirondack Mountains in order to get away from society and the overwhelming ideals it carries. Even there he writes how society and human impact follows him as he sees airplanes buzzing overhead or hears the roar of motorboats in the distance.

Aesthetic
The aesthetic value of urban open spaces is self-evident.  People enjoy viewing nature, especially when it is otherwise extensively deprived, as is the case in urban environments.  Therefore, open space offers the value of "substituting gray infrastructure." One researcher states how attractive neighborhoods contribute to positive attitudes and social norms that encourage walking and community values. Properties near urban open space tend to have a higher value. One study was able to demonstrate that, "a pleasant view can lead to a considerable increase in house price, particularly if the house overlooks water (8–10%) or open space (6–12%)." Certain benefits may be derived from exposure to virtual versions of the natural environment, too. For example, people who were shown pictures of scenic, natural environments had increased brain activity in the region associated with recalling happy memories, compared to people that were shown pictures of urban landscapes.

Impact on health 
The World Health Organization considers urban green spaces as important to human health. These areas have a positive impact on mental and physical health. Urban open spaces often include trees or other shrubbery that contribute to moderating temperatures and decreasing air pollution. Perceived general health is higher in populations with a higher percentage of green space in their environments. Urban open space access has also been directly related to reductions in the prevalence and severity of chronic diseases resulting from sedentary lifestyles, to improvements in mental well-being, and to reductions in population-wide health impacts from climate change.

Reductions in Chronic Disease Rates 
Improved access to green space is associated with reductions in cardiovascular disease symptoms, improved rates of physical activity, lower incidence of obesity, and improved respiratory health. Lower rates of cardiovascular biomarkers are associated with access to green space, showing a reduction in cardiovascular disease risk in populations living within 1 km of green space. Not only does access to urban green space reduce risk of cardiovascular disease, but increased access has been shown to improve recovery from major adverse cardiovascular events and lower all-cause mortality. Relationships have been found between increased access to green space, improved rates of physical activity, and reduced BMI. The percentage of sedentary and moderately active persons making use of an urban park increased when access to the park was improved.

Reductions in Mental Illness rates / Improved Social Cohesion 
Mental illness has been a major taboo and concern in the current fast paced world in which time to relax is undervalued.  Globally, mental illness is linked to eight million deaths each year. In urban areas, limited access to green space and poor quality of green spaces available may contribute to poor mental health outcomes. The distance an individual lives from a green space or park and the proportion of land designated as open space/parks has been shown to be inversely related to anxiety/mood disorder treatment counts in the community. Improved mental health may therefore be related to both measures - to distance from open space and proportion of open space within a neighborhood.  Even when physical activity rates are not shown to increase with greater access to green space, greater access to green space has been shown to decrease stress and improve social cohesion.

Effects of Urban Green Space on Respiratory Health 
Adequate urban green space access can be associated with better respiratory health outcomes, as long as green space areas meet certain requirements.  A new study showed that mortality due to pneumonia and chronic lower respiratory diseases could be reduced by minimizing fragmentation of green spaces and increasing the largest patch percentage of green space. Vegetation type (trees, shrubs and herbaceous layers) and lack of management (pruning, irrigation and fertilization) has been shown to affect a higher capacity to provide the ecosystem services of air purification and climate regulation within green urban spaces. The types of plants and shrubs are important because areas with large tree canopies can actually contribute to asthma and allergic sensitization.

Mechanism of Urban Open Space Health Effects 
Access to urban open space encourages physical activity and reduces ambient air pollution, heat, traffic noise and emissions. All are factors which contribute to the risks of chronic disease and mental illness. Individuals and families who lived closer to ‘formal’ parks or open space were more likely to achieve the recommended amounts of physical activity. Better respiratory health is associated with cleaner air quality. Cleaner air quality affects rates of chronic disease in populations exposed. “High concentrations of ambient particles can trigger the onset of acute myocardial infarction and increase hospitalization for cardiovascular disease”. Besides an association with lower BMI/obesity rates, this physical activity can increase lung function and be a protective factor against respiratory disease. Exposure to nature improve the Immune system. The contact of the human body with soil, turf, forest floor, expose it to many microorganisms what boost the immune system.

Impacts on mental health

The advocacy for mental health is becoming increasingly rampant, given the psychiatric illnesses that contribute significantly to morbidity and mortality in the United States. Health disparities existing within and amongst communities make this issue of paramount importance. The correlation between psychological distress and socioeconomic status (SES) has previously been examined. Sugiyama demonstrates that psychological distress is positively correlated with lower SES. A contributing factor to this socioeconomic disparity is the higher amounts of green space among residents with higher SES. Access to and active utilization of urban green space results in decreased rates of anxiety and depression, which are among the most common mental health illnesses. The positive association between mental health and green space was also supported by Van den Berg. The positive influence of urban green space on a community's perceived sense of mental wellness is achieved through uplifted moods, decreased stress levels, relaxation, recuperation, and increased human contact, which in itself promotes mental well-being. Given the burden of mental illness in the United States, it is important to examine the impact of urban green space on mental health and utilize this information to promote mental well-being across communities.

Modern research evidence demonstrates urban green space has positive impacts on population level mental health. Evidence shows that designated green space in urban areas facilitates social interaction, fosters well-being, increases opportunities for exercise, and contributes to improvement in common mental health problems such as anxiety, depression, and stress. One randomized trial studied two groups: one composed of residents living in a neighborhood that had a greening intervention and one that did not. Among the participants who now live in a green neighborhood, those feeling depressed decreased by 41.5% and self-reported poor mental health decreased by 62.8%. Another study indicates that "the difference in depressive symptoms between an individual living in an environment with no tree canopy and an environment with tree canopy is larger than the difference in symptoms associated between individuals who are uninsured compared with individuals with private insurance". Incorporating green space into urban design is an impactful, equitable, affordable, and accessible way to decrease the burden of mental health.

Further research on urban open spaces have recently found a positive link associating a mental health and well-being with increased access to green spaces in urban areas. The RESIDE Project, for example, has found a dose-response effect where the total area of public green spaces is associated with a greater overall wellbeing. Based on the study participants' survey responses, urban neighborhoods with more access to green spaces are more likely to report increased optimism, perception of usefulness, confidence, social interaction, and interest in new activities. Additionally, individuals living in neighborhoods within walking distance of parks have more opportunities to participate in recreational activities which is also associated with positive health outcomes. Another study published in the Journal of Epidemiology compared the effect of green spaces on 2,169 pairs of twins. After adjusting for genetic confounders and childhood environments, researchers found significant association between green spaces and decreased depression. Both examples of green spaces in urban areas illustrate how individual's environment can affect mental health and highlight the importance of access to green spaces.

Furthermore, there are several strategies that policymakers have pursued in order to increase the amount of green space in urban areas.  Two are explored here: a case study in Toronto's redevelopment of Brownfield sites, and a broad analysis of city-wide planning strategies.

Impacts on high temperatures
Urban areas tend to have higher temperatures than their surrounding undeveloped areas because of Urban Heat Islands, UHIs. Urban heat islands are areas with man-made infrastructure that contribute to the increased temperatures. The average temperature during the day in cities can be 18-27 degrees Fahrenheit higher than in the surrounding rural regions. This is an example of one type of UHI, surface heat islands. Surface heat islands encompass the area from the ground to the top of the tree-line. It is usually higher during the day when direct sunlight reaches urban structures (often with darker materials than natural areas) including the main contributor, pavement. The other type of UHI, atmospheric heat islands, are from above the tree-line to the level in the atmosphere where the urban area no longer has an effect. This type of heat island has increased heat at night due to the release of heat from infrastructure that built up throughout the day.

Green spaces within urban areas can help reduce these increased temperatures through shading and evapotranspiration. Shading comes from the taller plants, such as trees, planted in green spaces that can contribute to lowering the surface heat island effect. The shade provides protection from the sun for vulnerable populations, such as children, during periods of increased temperature, during the summer months or during a heat wave. Tree cover prevents some solar radiation from reaching the ground with its leaves and branches. This reduces the effect of surface urban heat islands. Open spaces that include any type of vegetation help offset the high temperatures through the natural process of evapotranspiration. Evapotranspiration releases water into the air therefore dissipating heat. There are many elements of an urban open space that can contribute to the mitigation of urban heat islands including the type of open space (park or nature reserve), type of plant species, and the density of vegetation. Green spaces contribute to the reduction of local heat, decreasing the overall effect of UHIs. The larger the distribution of green spaces, the bigger the area of heat reduction. Green spaces that are clustered together will have an additive heat reduction resulting in a greater decrease in temperature in the local area compared to surrounding areas.

Impacts on air quality
Human activity has increased air pollution in the earth's atmosphere and trees play an essential role in removing human-made pollutants from the air, aka particulate matter (PM). Trees produce oxygen and absorb CO2. In urban green spaces, trees filter out man-made pollutants. Air quality data collected on cities with and without urban green space has shown that areas with an abundance of trees have considerably less air pollutants, i.e. O3, PM10, NO2, SO2, and CO. As air pollutants accumulate in the atmosphere, vulnerable populations, such as children, may suffer from increased incidences of respiratory disease. Particulate matter or particle pollution with a diameter of 10 microns (PM10) or 2.5 microns (PM2.5) is associated with heart diseases and respiratory diseases including lung cancer.

Globally, particulate matter has increased over 28% in indoor air and 35% in outdoor air. Children spend most of their time at school, around 10 hours daily, and the indoor and outdoor air has a large impact on their health. Schools located in urban areas have higher particulate matter than schools in rural areas. Compared with children in schools located in rural areas, children who attend schools located in industrial areas and urban cities have higher levels of urinary PAHs (polycyclic aromatic hydrocarbons) metabolites, which is linked to air pollution.

There are two different ways that green spaces can reduce the pollution of particulate matter including preventing distribution of particulate from pollutants or by reducing the particulate matter from traveling to other places. There is a disagreement about the association of living near green spaces or having high exposure to greenness and illness such as allergies, rhinitis, and eye and nose symptoms. Higher exposure to tree canopy and pollen was associated with a high risk of prevalence rhinitis, allergic sensitization, wheezing, and asthma among children 7 years-old. More studies are needed to explain the effect of urban green spaces on children relating to air quality. These studies should take into consideration the interconnectedness of tree species, geographic areas, temperature, and other pollutant-like traffic.

Case study: redevelopment of brownfield sites

Brownfield sites are defined as "abandoned, idled, or under-used industrial and commercial facilities where expansion or redevelopment is complicated by real or perceived environmental contamination." The City of Toronto undertook an extensive redevelopment of Brownfield sites into green spaces starting in the 1950s. The first step was motivation. In 1954, Hurricane Hazel hit the city and caused considerable damage.  The city subsequently obtained "flood lands" as a buffer to protect against future hurricanes. Later, there was an impetus to convert contaminated brownfields into greenspace for the perceived benefits, the top reasons being the creation of ecological habitats and to provide recreational opportunities. After establishing the motivation, the second step was to conduct a survey of all the Brownfield sites.  Although the City of Toronto was responsible for the management of Brownfield sites, they had limited resources to do so. They began by taking an inventory of all the land that could be considered Brownfields. By contrast, the greenspace is much more actively managed by both the City of Toronto and the Toronto Region Conservation Authority. Over 12% of the urban land in Toronto is classified as green space.

The third step involved holding meetings with both public and private stakeholders. Including the local neighborhood in the decision making process was seen as key to securing the cooperation of the public. Because there was little perceived economic gain by private stakeholders, the redevelopment project was largely carried out by the public sector. The fourth step was delegation. A single department was put in charge of the project, which in this case was the municipal government's Parks Department (the government absorbed 90–100% of the implementation costs). It was expected that implementation would take several years after delegation – in this case, redevelopment took between 3–5 years for each individual site. The fifth step was collaboration with other government agencies. Government agencies that shared land in common with the municipal government, such as flood plains and waterfronts, negotiated with each other in order to ensure the concurrency of the goals between the various agencies and Toronto's redevelopment efforts. A sixth step involved the acquisition of private land, which was either donated or purchased by the city. It is important to recognize that a substantial amount of Brownfield sites may reside on private land, and that a city must legally acquire it in order to implement redevelopment. The seventh step assessed each site individually. Because the sites were contaminated to different degrees, specific cleanup criteria were determined for each site, with various remediation strategies for each. The most common method was to cap (bury) the contaminants in situ.  None of this could have happened unless there was a prerequisite zeroth step: creating an atmosphere of high trust. The City of Toronto was trusted by its citizens, and that trust enabled the city to redevelop Brownfield sites. The public sector was expected to do its job and to prevent people using the new green space from being exposed to contaminants. CITY–WIDE GREEN SPACE PLANNING: The concept that ecosystems provide services that improve quality of life for city residents is becoming more and more recognized.

With that recognition, a shift in understanding green space from being an aesthetic contribution to city beautification to an essential part of the urban center is occurring. However, city planners are increasingly faced with densification and population increase in urban centers. This places stress on existing green spaces and can inhibit the creation of new green spaces. Notably, per capita GDP was found to be positively correlated with the amount of green space coverage. This suggests that economic systems that facilitate the accumulation of wealth can provision a city with increased green space. This must be balanced with the finding that greening efforts in low income sections of a city can cause rents to rise and make housing less affordable there. Additionally, it was found that European cities that distributed the management of green space among several governmental agencies were less successful in green space planning compared to cities with only one agency responsible.

Lack of public awareness about the value of urban green space can also lead to less stakeholder contribution to green space planning.  This suggests that public education can lead the population to more fully participate as informed stakeholders to a much greater extent. Additionally, improvement in the quality of green space can be pursued when no additional green space can be added. Furthermore, the concept of "green fingers," can be implemented in city-wide planning in order to optimize green space geometry. "Green fingers" is a strategy that connects urban green space from the city center to the periphery, thereby linking the rural to the urban in a continuous fashion and enabling better resident access.  Developing green roofs, gardens, and facades may be appropriate strategies for private land and buildings, but these cannot fulfill the functions of a public green space.  Nevertheless they provide valuable contributions to resident quality of life, and can be supported by various tax beak incentives.  Finally, heritage green space sites can be protected by various laws and regulations.  All in all, the implementation of urban green space strategies must consider the entire urban region in question in order to achieve the overarching goal to provide urban residents with a higher quality of life.

While the current research on the impacts of green space of mental health appears broad, the future of green space is still of utmost importance.  Many US cities have unique plans to address this issue, while others are already experiencing the effects of reduced greenspace.  Denver, for example, once boasted a meager 20% of the city having been paved or built-over in the mid-1970s.  However, this number could reach closer to 70% by 2040 due to an explosion of the city's population. The hyper-functionality of modern-day cities must also be able to exist in a way that portrays beauty in the infrastructure itself.  One proposed solution to this involves shifting grey infrastructure made of concrete towards green infrastructure that looks less industrial and more like an ecosystem. This proposal, brought forth by the California Center for Sustainable Communities, accompanies another idea that cities should assess green space initiatives based on their cultural and natural assets.  For example, Cairns, Australia embraces "tropical urbanism" as the basis for its green space landscape throughout the city, while Salt Lake City describes its future parks as "mountain urbanism".  One study found that there was not a significant association between the amount of green space in residents' local areas and mental wellbeing, suggesting that the quality of green space may be what matters most.  Ultimately, improving the quality of green space is a main concern for cities of the future and acting on a city's cultural and natural strengths is the best method to achieve this.

For children and adolescents

Impacts on physical health
The adolescent years are extremely important for children due to it being a time of growth, development, and instillation of habits. When children are given the opportunity to be active, they typically take advantage of it. Children with a greater access to parks and recreational facilities through urban green space have been found to be more active than children who lack access. The access to green spaces has shown an association with recreational walking, increased physical activity, and reduced sedentary time in all ages. In coordination, it has been seen that higher residential green space is associated with lower BMI scores. If children are given the opportunity to be active and maintain a healthy BMI in their adolescent years, they are less likely to be obese as adults.

Impacts on mental health
Children exposed to urban green spaces have the opportunity to expend energy by interacting with their environment and other people through exercise. One study has shown that without access to urban green spaces, some children have problems with hyperactivity, peer interactions, and good conduct. The important interactions with nature, animals, and peers have been positively influential in child development and reduction in behavioral issues such as Attention Deficit Hyperactivity Disorder (ADHD). Urban green spaces allow children to expel their extra energy and improve their ability to focus when needed both at school and home.

In addition to behavioral problems, and likely connected, access to urban green space has been proven to be helpful for cognitive development. With urban green space giving children the opportunity to get outside and expend energy, children are more focused in school and have a better working memory and reduced inattentiveness.

Another facet of urban green space improving mental health is giving children access to a community. Recreational activities and playing at the park gives children opportunities to interact with other children and develop a social circle and social skills in general. Children with a good social network feel socially included, promoting more confidence and well-being in their everyday lives. Overall, the bonding experiences that result from urban green spaces tie in with a child's cognitive and social development.

A 2020 study suggested that increased access to urban green space increased the IQ of children by 2.6 points. (around 3% on average)

A 2021 study found that higher exposure to woodland urban green spaces or urban forest but not grassland is associated with improved cognitive development and risks of mental problems for urban adolescents.

History

Ancient Rome
The term "rus in urbe" meaning "country in the city" was used in Rome around the first century C.E. Urban planning in Rome valued the natural landscape and took account for environmental factors. It was thought that by building a city with regard to the local countryside, the people living there would be healthier and happier. English landscapes would later take inspiration from Roman urban planning concepts in their own open spaces.

London
London has a long history of urban open space, which has significantly influenced development of modern parks, and is still among the greenest capital cities in the world.

The basis for many urban open spaces seen today across Europe and the West began its process of development in London in the 17th and 18th centuries.  What would eventually become urban open green space began as paved public plazas.  Though they were intended to be open to the public, these spaces began to be re-designated as private parks around the late eighteenth century.  It was during this period that the areas became pockets of green in the urban environment, commonly modelled after the natural wild of the countryside.

The first parks to reverse the trend of privatization and again be opened to the public were England's royal parks in the nineteenth century.  This was done in response to the extensive and unexpected population movement from the country into cities.  As a result, "the need for open space was socially and politically pressing… The problems, to which the provision of parks was expected to offer some relief, were easy to describe: overcrowding, poverty, squalor, ill-health, lack of morals and morale, and so on". Such sentiments again received significant popular support during the "City Beautiful" movement in America during the 1890s and 1900s.  Both trends focused on providing the public an opportunity to receive all of the perceived health and lifestyle benefits of having access to open space within urban environments.

Current trends
Segmentation of urban open spaces was particularly prominent in America during the twentieth century.  Since the late 1800s romantic park systems, open space designers have been concerned with guiding, containing or separating urban growth, distributing recreation, and/or producing scenic amenity, mostly within the framework of geometric abstractions."
Such segmentation was especially prominent in the 1990s, when urban open spaces took a path similar to that of parks, following the modernization trend of segmentation and specialization of areas. As modernity stressed "increased efficiency, quantifiablity, predictability, and control… In concert with the additional social divisions", open spaces grew more specific in purpose.  Perhaps this increase in division of social classes' use of open space, demonstrated by the segmentation of the spaces, displays a situation similar to the privatization of London parks in the eighteenth century, which displayed a desire to make classes more distinct.

Today, places like Scandinavia, which do not have a significant history of outdoor recreation and gathering places, are seeing a proliferation of urban open spaces and adopting a lifestyle supported by the extra urban breathing room.  An example of this can be seen in Copenhagen where an area closed to car traffic in 1962 developed, in just a few decades, a culture of public political gatherings and outdoor cafes emerged.  Not only is appreciation for and use of urban open spaces flourishing in locations that historically lacked such traditions, the number of urban open spaces is increasing rapidly as well.

Non-sustainable gardening, including mowing, use of chemical fertilisers, herbicides and pesticides harm green spaces. Contrarywise, one of the conditions for good urban open space is sustainable gardening.

Urban blue spaces 
At the beginning of the 21st century studies shows that living near water considerably improve physical and mental health, increase life longevity.

Inequalities 
Green space access is related to health inequality for minority populations.  Neighborhoods with higher percentages of minority residents often have lower access to open space and parks as the result of past red-lining policies and current inequities in funding priorities. Urban open space is under strong pressure. Due to increasing urbanization, combined with a spatial planning policy of densification, more people face the prospect of living in less green residential environments, especially people from low economic strata. This may cause environmental inequality with regard to the distribution of (access) to public green space. The parks that do exist in minority neighborhoods are often small (with lower acreage per person than parks in majority ethnicity neighborhoods), not well maintained, unsafe, or are otherwise ill-suited for community needs. A large epidemiological study. concluded that wealthier individuals were generally healthier than individuals with a lower income, explained by the pattern that wealthier individuals reside in areas more concentrated with green space.  Urban open spaces in higher socioeconomic neighborhoods were also more likely to have trees that provided shade, a water feature (e.g. pond, lake and creek), walking and cycling paths, lighting, signage regarding dog access and signage restricting other activities as well. This difference in access has been proven, however, further study is needed to evaluate the exact health impacts.

A study conducted in Australia provided insight into how there is a correlation between community development/community safety and natural open space within the community. Open areas allow community members to engage in highly social activities and facilitate the expansion of social networks and friendship development. As people become more social they decrease the perceptions of fear and mistrust allowing a sense of community bondage. Distant or lack of adequate green space, therefore, may contribute to higher rates of inactivity and greater health effects among minority populations.

Green gentrification

See also

References

Further reading
 

Urban planning
Open space
Greenways
Urban
Protected areas
Zoning